The 2012 North Rhine-Westphalia state election was held on 13 May 2012 to elect the members of the Landtag of North Rhine-Westphalia. The incumbent minority government of the Social Democratic Party (SPD) and The Greens led by Minister-President Hannelore Kraft was returned with a majority and continued in office. The seat count drastically increased from 181 in the previous election to 237.

Background
Germany's largest state has often been described as a bellwether in recent years. The SPD governed continuously from 1966 until a CDU–FDP coalition took control in the 2005 state election. This defeat led Chancellor Gerhard Schröder to call a federal election, which he lost.

In the 2010 state election, the CDU held a 0.1% lead over the SPD, though both parties won 67 seats. The SPD and Greens emerged one seat short of a majority, while the CDU and FDP were 10 seats short. This was due to the new presence of The Left. After failed negotiations with The Left, the SPD and Greens formed a minority government with SPD leader Hannelore Kraft as Minister-President. The state budget was rejected by the Landtag on 14 March 2012. The government expected the FDP to abstain from the vote, allowing it to pass. However, the CDU, FDP, and Left all voted against the budget, and it was rejected. This led to the dissolution of the Landtag and a snap election.

Campaign and issues
The SPD and Greens sought to win a majority; polls predicted they would make gains. The CDU nominated federal Environment Minister Norbert Röttgen as their lead candidate. He was criticised for refusing to state whether, if the CDU lost the election, he would continue to lead the state party or return to federal politics. Opinion polls showed that voters preferred Kraft as Minister-President by a wide margin. The CDU made tackling the state's €230 billion debt a key issue; at one point they used a giant inflatable "debt mountain" as a prop.

The FDP had fallen out of six state elections since joining the federal government in 2009, but had managed to retain their seats with 8.2% of the vote in the Schleswig-Holstein state election a week before the North Rhine-Westphalia election.

The Pirate Party ran on a loose platform of Internet freedom and grassroots democracy.

Parties
The table below lists parties represented in the previous Landtag of North Rhine-Westphalia.

Opinion polling

Party polling

Seat forecast
Analysts on election.de forecast the likely results of the 128 direct mandates. These seats traditionally have been held by either the CDU or SPD, with minor parties standing little chance of winning any.

Minister-President polling

Election result
There was a major swing from the CDU to the SPD and to the Pirates, who entered their fourth state parliament in a row. The Greens stayed essentially level, while the FDP bucked the national trend, achieving a 2-point swing in their favour. This was attributed to the popular leadership of Christian Lindner. Lindner was elected FDP federal leader one year later, after their historic defeat in the 2013 German federal election. The Left lost over half their voteshare and lost their seats after just two years in the Landtag.

The SPD won a landslide in the direct mandates, winning 99 seats to the CDU's 29. This led to a large number of overhang seats for the SPD and leveling seats for other parties, increasing the size of the Landtag from 181 to 237 seats.

State CDU leader Norbert Röttgen resigned, but refused to become leader of the opposition in the Landtag of North Rhine-Westphalia, instead continuing to serve as Minister for the Environment. Because of that, in what was considered unceremonious and highly unusual move (ministers are normally given the courtesy of resigning by themselves even after scandals), Chancellor Merkel fired him under Article 64 of the German Basic Law three days after the election.

Sources

Elections in North Rhine-Westphalia
North Rhine-Westphalia state election, 2012